Daria Antończyk (born 7 December 1983) is a Polish footballer who plays as a goalkeeper for AZS PWSZ Wałbrzych and the Poland women's national football team. Antończyk was previously an amateur boxer and won a bronze medal at the 2002 Polish Boxing Championship.

Biography

Antończyk comes from Hawk Zdroj, Poland, and grew up in a family that engaged in several sports. Before taking up football she was a cross-country runner, played volleyball competitively, and took up boxing.

Club career
Antończyk took up football after agreeing to accompany a college friend to a trial with their local club RTP Unia Racibórz. With Unia Racibórz, Antończyk started playing as a forward but soon switched to goalkeeper. She signed a one-year contract with Dutch BeNe League club Ajax Amsterdam in September 2013.

International career
Antończyk made her debut for Poland women's national football team in a 2–0 2011 FIFA Women's World Cup qualifying win over Romania women's national football team at Dyskobolia Stadium in October 2009.

References

External links 
 
 Profile at Ajax Heldinnen 

1983 births
Living people
Poland women's international footballers
Polish women boxers
People from Jastrzębie-Zdrój
Women's association football goalkeepers
Polish women's footballers
RTP Unia Racibórz players
AFC Ajax (women) players
Expatriate women's footballers in the Netherlands
Polish expatriate footballers
Polish expatriate sportspeople in the Netherlands
Sportspeople from Silesian Voivodeship
20th-century Polish women
21st-century Polish women